Black Walnut is an unincorporated community in St. Charles County, in the U.S. state of Missouri.

History
A post office called Black Walnut was established in 1875, and remained in operation until 1908. The community was named for a grove of black walnut timber near the original town site.

References

Unincorporated communities in St. Charles County, Missouri
Unincorporated communities in Missouri